Lerma Elmira Bulauitan-Gabito (born 17 October 1974 in Peñablanca, Cagayan) is a Filipino long jumper. Her personal best jump is 6.56 metres, achieved in June 2004 in Colombo.

She won the silver medal at the 2001 Asian Championships, the bronze medal at the 2003 Asian Championships and finished sixth at the 2005 Asian Championships. She also competed at the Olympic Games in 2000 and 2004 as well as the World Championships in 2001 and 2003 without reaching the final.

She was the gold medallist in the long jump at the 2003 Southeast Asian Games.

Competition record

References
 
 

1974 births
Living people
Filipino female long jumpers
Olympic track and field athletes of the Philippines
Athletes (track and field) at the 2000 Summer Olympics
Athletes (track and field) at the 2004 Summer Olympics
Athletes (track and field) at the 2002 Asian Games
Athletes (track and field) at the 2006 Asian Games
Sportspeople from Cagayan
University Athletic Association of the Philippines players
Southeast Asian Games medalists in athletics
Southeast Asian Games gold medalists for the Philippines
Southeast Asian Games competitors for the Philippines
Southeast Asian Games silver medalists for the Philippines
Competitors at the 2001 Southeast Asian Games
Competitors at the 2003 Southeast Asian Games
Competitors at the 2005 Southeast Asian Games
Asian Games competitors for the Philippines